Charles Neal Barney (June 27, 1875 - April 24, 1949) was a Massachusetts politician who served as a member of the Common Council and as the 31st Mayor of Lynn, Massachusetts.

Biography
Barney was born in Lynn, Massachusetts on June 27, 1875 to William M. Barney and Mary L. Neal. He was the grandson of Lynn's tenth mayor Peter Morrell Neal.

Barney graduated from Tufts College receiving his A.B. in 1895 and his A.M., in 1909. While at Tufts Barney joined  Theta Delta Chi.  Barney received his law degree (LL.B.) from Boston University School of Law in 1898.

Barney married Maizie Blaikie in Malden, Massachusetts on June 27, 1901.

From 1908 to 1918 Barney taught Equity  at Northeastern University School of Law.

Barney was a member of the Lynn Common Council from 1901 to 1904, mayor of Lynn from 1906 to 1907, and a Presidential Elector in 1908.

In 1918 Barney went to work as the chief counsel and secretary for the New Jersey based Worthington Pump and Machinery Corporation. In 1942 Barney was elected as the Worthington Pump and Machinery Corporation's vice-president and secretary.

Barney, who was a great nephew of Maria Mitchell,  and from 1947 to 1949 served as a president of the Maria Mitchell Association.

He died on April 24, 1949.

Further reading
Biography of Charles Neal Barney in the Concise Encyclopedia of Tufts History (ed. Anne Sauer)
A Guide to the Charles Neal Barney papers, 1900.

References

1875 births
1949 deaths
Mayors of Lynn, Massachusetts
Tufts University alumni
Lynn, Massachusetts City Council members
1908 United States presidential electors
Massachusetts Republicans
Boston University School of Law alumni